The Ministry of Culture of the Union of Soviet Socialist Republics (USSR), formed in 1936, was one of the most important government offices in the Soviet Union. It was formerly (until 1946) known as the State Committee on the Arts. The Ministry, at the all-Union level, was established in 1953, after existing as a State Committee of the Council of Ministers for several years. The Ministry was led by the Minister of Culture, prior to 1953 a Chairman, who was nominated by the Chairman of the Council of Ministers and confirmed by the Presidium of the Supreme Soviet, and was a member of the Council of Ministers of the USSR. It was responsible for the cultural affairs and activities within the Soviet Union.

List of Ministers of Culture 

 Panteleimon Ponomarenko (March 15, 1953 - March 9, 1954)
 Georgy Aleksandrov (March 9, 1954 - March 10, 1955)
 Nikolai Mikhailov (March 21, 1955 - May 4, 1960)
 Yekaterina Furtseva (May 4, 1960 - October 24, 1974)
 Pyotr Demichev (November 14, 1974 - June 18, 1986)
 Vasily Zakharov (August 15, 1986 - June 7, 1989)
 Nikolai Gubenko (November 21, 1989 - August 28, 1991; September 7, 1991 - November 27, 1991)

See also

 Government of the Soviet Union (Council of Ministers) – Ministries

References

External links
 Governments of  the Union of Soviet Socialist Republics from 1917–1964 and 1964–1991

Culture
Soviet Union
1936 establishments in the Soviet Union
Soviet culture
Government agencies established in 1936
1991 disestablishments in the Soviet Union
Government agencies disestablished in 1991